The Pine River is a  tributary of the Kettle River in eastern Minnesota, United States.  It begins at the outlet of Big Pine Lake near the western border of Pine County, Minnesota, and flows northeast and east, reaching the Kettle River at Rutledge.

See also
List of rivers of Minnesota

References

External links
Minnesota Watersheds
USGS Hydrologic Unit Map - State of Minnesota (1974)

Rivers of Minnesota
Rivers of Pine County, Minnesota